Jong Chol-min (born 29 October 1988) is a North Korean international football player.

Jong has made two appearances for the Korea DPR national football team in the 2010 FIFA World Cup qualifying rounds. He also played for Korea DPR in the 2005 FIFA U-17 World Championship in Peru and the 2007 FIFA U-20 World Cup in Canada.

Goals for Senior National Team

References

1988 births
Living people
North Korean footballers
North Korea international footballers
Rimyongsu Sports Club players

Association football forwards